The Chris Rye House is a historic building located in Mason City, Iowa, United States.  Rye was a local contractor who built this Prairie School influenced house for his family.  He may have designed it as well.  Rye was responsible for constructing many of Walter Burley Griffin's houses in the Rock Crest – Rock Glen development, as well as other buildings in north-central Iowa.  The exterior of the two-story house is a unique combination of brick and stucco, and it's capped with a hip roof.  It was listed on the National Register of Historic Places in 1980.

References

Houses completed in 1912
Prairie School architecture in Iowa
Houses in Mason City, Iowa
National Register of Historic Places in Mason City, Iowa
Houses on the National Register of Historic Places in Iowa